Sedej is a Slavic surname. Notable people with the surname include:

Aljaž Sedej (born 1988), Slovenian judoka
Maksim Sedej (1909–1974), Slovenian painter

Slavic-language surnames